Michael Strangelove (born 1962) is a Canadian writer and academic, currently a lecturer in the Department of Communication at the University of Ottawa. His two most notable works include Watching YouTube: Extraordinary Videos by Ordinary People and The Empire of Mind: Digital Piracy and the Anti-Capitalist Movement, which was nominated for a Governor General's Award for English non-fiction in 2006.

Books authored
 1991-93 - Directory of Electronic Journals, Newsletters and Academic Discussion Lists, 1, 2, and 3rd Editions (American Association of Research Libraries), coauthored with Diane Kovacs.
 1994 - How to Advertise on the Internet (Strangelove Press), coauthored with Aneurin Bosley.
 2005 - The Empire of Mind: Digital Piracy and the Anti-Capitalist Movement (University of Toronto Press).
 2010 - Watching YouTube: Extraordinary Videos by Ordinary People (University of Toronto Press).
 2015 - Post-TV: Piracy, Cord-Cutting, and the Future of Television (University of Toronto Press).

References

Canadian non-fiction writers
Academic staff of the University of Ottawa
Living people
1962 births
Canadian technology writers
University of Ottawa alumni
Writers from Ottawa
Businesspeople from Ottawa
Canadian educators